Una Mujer (A Woman) is the first studio album with new unreleased songs of Myriam. Before the success her debut album was a lot of composer got interested in sending songs for Myriam. Soraya, Mr. Manzanero, Claudia Brant are some of the writers that participated in this album. It was released in March 2003, the album broke all the records and expectecions everyone had.

Album information
The album includes 11 unreleased songs and the remix of the song "The Rose", song that give her the 1st place on the reality. The album's genre was Latin ballad/pop. When the album was released it reach the peak of the tops in Mexico and USA. At the month the album was released it was certificated as platinum for selling more than 150,000 copies i MEX.

The album was recorded in the a studio in Mexico City, produced by Memo Gil. Also is important to mention that Gaby Cardenas who was her teacher in the reality collaborate in the album, guiding Myriam in the vocal plane.

Track listing

Special Edition bonus tracks

"New Photos"
 9 new tracks (sang in Desafio de Estrellas) Studio Versions
 New Cover
 2 New Bonus tracks
 Prefiero Estar Sola
 Amor Secreto

Certifications
In 2003, Una Mujer was certified gold in Mexico.

References

2003 albums
Myriam Montemayor Cruz albums